Rutland Island, also sometimes known as Inishmacadurn, is an island in County Donegal, Ireland, and an electoral and census reporting district covering it, surrounding islands and part of the mainland. The island itself has no permanent inhabitants, but the district, which includes Burtonport and its environs, had 1,428 residents in 2006. The island lies between Burtonport and the inhabited Arranmore Island, and is not officially served by ferry.

History 
The island was previously populated, with a planned settlement having been established by William Burton Conyngham from 1784, including a street of residences and business premises, with the area's post office, school house and a fish landing and processing facility being built in this village. While fish catches declined heavily shortly after construction, with services closing or leaving, the island remained inhabited into the 1960s.

Mains electricity reached the island in 1957, due to its being a crucial stepping stone for the Arranmore supply, but piped water has never been provided for its remaining housing stock, which consists entirely of holiday homes.

Rutland Island has become a popular holiday destination with a number of holiday homes built in the first decade of the 2000s.

Demographics

The table below reports data on Rutland's population taken from Discover the Islands of Ireland (Alex Ritsema, Collins Press, 1999) and the Census of Ireland. Census data in Ireland before 1841 are not considered complete and/or reliable.

Fauna
Badgers have been recorded from this island.  There is evidence that their diet is poor.

The island is also home to some foxes.

Flora
The following algae have been reported from Rutland South Channel: Gracilaria gracilis (Stackhouse) Steentoft, L.M. Irvine et Farnham; Rhodymenia holmesii Ardissone; Polysiphonia fucoides (Hudson) Greville; Polysiphonia nigra (Hudson) Batters; Sphondylothamnion multifidum (Hudson) Nägeli; Heterosiphonia plumosa (J. Ellis) Batters.

References

Former populated places in Ireland
Gaeltacht places in County Donegal
Ghost towns in Europe
Islands of County Donegal
Uninhabited islands of Ireland
Planned communities in the Republic of Ireland